Frederik Schwarz (1753-1838) was a Danish actor. He was an elite actor of the Royal Danish Theatre from 1773 to 1810. He played roles in both comedy and tragedy and had a great impact on the contemporary acting tradition in Denmark when forming the new organisation of the theater, as the founder and manager of the Det Dramatiske Selskab from 1775 to 1778 and as the theater's acting instructor from 1779 to 1816.

References 

 Schwarz, Frederik i Nordisk familjebok (andra upplagan, 1916)

1753 births
1838 deaths
18th-century Danish male actors
19th-century Danish male actors